KRI Teluk Mandar (514) is the third  of the Indonesian Navy.

Design 

She is powered by two diesel engines, with total sustained power output of  distributed in two shaft.

Teluk Mandar has a capacity of 200 troops,  of cargo (which includes 17 main battle tanks), and 4 LCVPs on davits. The ship has a complement of 90 personnel, including 13 officers.

She are armed with three single Bofors 40 mm L/70 guns, two single Rheinmettal 20 mm autocannons, and two single DShK 12.7 mm heavy machine guns.

The ship has helicopter decks in the amidships and aft for small to medium helicopter such as Westland Wasp or MBB Bo 105.

Construction and commissioning 
KRI Teluk Mandar was built by Korea Tacoma Shipyard in Masan, ordered in June 1979. She was commissioned in July 1981.

References

Bibliography
 

Ships built by Hanjin Heavy Industries
Amphibious warfare vessels of the Indonesian Navy
Teluk Semangka-class tank landing ships
1981 ships